ORFO is one of the oldest and most popular programs in the Russian spelling. It also provides grammar check and style, makes autosummary of document, shows definition of word, displays possible synonyms and antonyms of the given word. It is developed by the Russian company Informatic LLC.

Since 1995 Informatic spell-checking modules are licensed by Microsoft Corp. and incorporated into Localized Russian MS Office until 2010. Since the version of Microsoft Office 2010, developer has abandoned the use of embedded ORFO in the office suite.

There is free online version of ORFO available.

ORFO was also mentioned in 2003 Technical Guidelines for United Nations Internet Publishing.

ORFO has full support for the Cyrillic letter Yo ⟨⟩.

Supported Products 
Another popular company PROMT uses ORFO in its translation products.

Ritlabs has supported ORFO in its product The Bat! since 2014. 
 
ORFO also supports LibreOffice.

Available Languages
ORFO supports 8 languages: Russian, Ukrainian, English, German, French, Portuguese, Spanish, and Italian.

See also
Yo
Yoficator
Hunspell

External links

References

Spell checkers
Grammar checkers
Free spelling checking programs
Language software for Linux
Language software for macOS
Language software for Windows